Afroligusticum is a genus of flowering plants belonging to the carrot family, Apiaceae.

Its native range is Tropical and Southern Africa.

Species:

 Afroligusticum aculeolatum (Engl.) P.J.D.Winter
 Afroligusticum claessensii (C.Norman) P.J.D.Winter
 Afroligusticum elgonense (H.Wolff) P.J.D.Winter
 Afroligusticum elliotii (Engl.) C.Norman
 Afroligusticum linderi (C.Norman) P.J.D.Winter
 Afroligusticum mattirolii (Chiov.) P.J.D.Winter
 Afroligusticum petitianum (A.Rich.) P.J.D.Winter
 Afroligusticum piovanii (Chiov.) Kljuykov & Zakharova
 Afroligusticum runssoricum (Engl.) P.J.D.Winter
 Afroligusticum scottianum (Engl.) P.J.D.Winter
 Afroligusticum thodei (T.H.Arnold) P.J.D.Winter
 Afroligusticum townsendii (Charpin & Fern.Casas) P.J.D.Winter
 Afroligusticum volkensii (Engl.) P.J.D.Winter
 Afroligusticum wilmsianum (H.Wolff) P.J.D.Winter

References

Apioideae